The El Doctor Formation is a geologic formation in Mexico. It preserves fossils dating back to the Albian and Cenomanian stages of the Cretaceous period.

Description 
The light grey micritic limestone sequence with intercalated black chert lenses was deposited in an open marine basin with a hypersaline and/or poorly oxygenated bottom.

Fossil content 
The formation has provided the following fossils:
Fish
 Enchodus zipapanensis
Crustaceans
 Aeger hidalguensis
 Polzia eldoctorensis
 Victoriacaris muhiensis
 Palinurus sp.

See also 
 List of fossiliferous stratigraphic units in Mexico
 Sierra Madre Formation

References

Bibliography 
 
 
 

Geologic formations of Mexico
Cretaceous System of North America
Cretaceous Mexico
Albian Stage
Cenomanian Stage
Mudstone formations
Deep marine deposits
Paleontology in Mexico